Trinity Ellis (born 28 April 2002) is a Canadian luger.

Career
In January 2019, Ellis competed at her first Senior World Championships, finishing in 29th. In November 2019, Ellis had a top 10 finish on the World Cup Circuit.

In January 2022, Ellis was named to Canada's 2022 Olympic team.

References

External links
 
 
 

2002 births
Living people
Canadian female lugers
Olympic lugers of Canada
Lugers at the 2022 Winter Olympics
Sportspeople from Vancouver